George William Norris (July 11, 1861September 2, 1944) was an American politician from the state of Nebraska in the Midwestern United States. He served five terms in the United States House of Representatives as a Republican, from 1903 until 1913, and five terms in the United States Senate, from 1913 until 1943. He served four terms as a Republican and his final term as an independent. Norris was defeated for re-election in 1942.
 
Norris was a leader of progressive and liberal causes in Congress. He is best known for his sponsorship of the Tennessee Valley Authority in 1933 during the Great Depression. It became a major development agency in the Upper South that constructed dams for flood control and electricity generation for a wide rural area. In addition, Norris was known for his intense crusades against what he characterized as "wrong and evil", his liberalism, his insurgency against party leaders, his non-interventionist foreign policy, and his support for labor unions.

President Franklin D. Roosevelt called him "the very perfect, gentle knight of American progressive ideals", and this has been the theme of all his biographers. A 1957 advisory panel of 160 scholars recommended that Norris was the top choice for the five best Senators in U.S. history.

Early life

Norris was born in 1861 in York Township, Sandusky County, Ohio. He was the eleventh child of poor, uneducated farmers of Scots-Irish and Pennsylvania Dutch descent. He graduated from Baldwin University and earned his LL.B. degree in 1883 at the law school of Valparaiso University.

He moved west to practice law, settling in Beaver City, Nebraska. In 1889 he married Pluma Lashley; the couple had three daughters (Gertrude, Hazel, and Marian) before her 1901 death. The widower Norris married Ellie Leonard in 1903; they had no children.

Political career

House insurgent

In 1900 Norris relocated to the larger town of McCook, where he became active as a Republican in local politics. In 1902, running as a Republican, he was elected to the House of Representatives for Nebraska's 5th congressional district.

In that election, he was supported by the railroads; however, in 1906 he broke with them, supporting Theodore Roosevelt's plans to regulate rates for the benefit of shippers, such as the merchants who lived in his district. A prominent insurgent after 1908, Norris led the revolt in 1910 against House Speaker Joseph G. Cannon. By a vote of 191 to 156, the House legislators created a new system in which seniority would automatically move members ahead, even against the wishes of the leadership. This had the practical effect for several decades of benefiting Southern Democratic congressmen, who became powerful in both the House and the Senate. Because Southern states had effectively disenfranchised most blacks by new constitutions and discriminatory practices at the turn of the century, it was a one-party region, known as the Solid South, representing only conservative white voters.

In January 1911, Norris helped create the National Progressive Republican League and served as its vice president. He originally supported Robert M. La Follette, Sr. for the 1912 presidential nomination but then switched to Roosevelt. However, he refused to bolt the Republican convention and join Roosevelt's Progressive Party. He instead ran for the Senate as a Republican.

Senator

As a leading Progressive Republican, Norris supported the direct election of senators, ratified by the states in the Seventeenth Amendment. He also promoted the conversion of all state legislatures to the unicameral system. Only the Nebraska Legislature passed this change in 1934. All other states have retained a two-house system.

Norris supported some of President Woodrow Wilson's domestic programs but became a firm isolationist, fearing that bankers were manipulating the country into war. In the face of enormous pressure from the media and the administration, Norris was one of only six senators to vote against the declaration of war on Germany in 1917. 

Looking at the war in Europe, he said, "Many instances of cruelty and inhumanity can be found on both sides." Norris believed the government wanted to enter this war only because the wealthy had already aided the British financially in the war. He told Congress the only people who would benefit from the war were "munition manufacturers, stockbrokers, and bond dealers", adding that
"war brings no prosperity to the great mass of common and patriotic citizens.... War brings prosperity to the stock gambler on Wall Streetto those who are already in possession of more wealth than can be realized or enjoyed."

Norris joined the Irreconcilables, who opposed and defeated U.S. participation in the Treaty of Versailles and the League of Nations in 1919.

After several terms, Norris's seniority gained him the chairmanship of the Agriculture and Forestry and the Judiciary committees. Norris was a leader of the Farm Bloc, advocated the rights of labor, sponsored the ("Lame Duck") Twentieth Amendment to the United States Constitution, and proposed to abolish the Electoral College. He failed on these issues in the 1920s.

In that period, he blocked industrialist Henry Ford's proposals to modernize the Tennessee Valley by building a private dam at Muscle Shoals, insisting it was a project the federal government should handle. Norris twice succeeded in getting Congress to pass legislation for a federal electric power system based at Muscle Shoals, but it was vetoed by presidents Calvin Coolidge and Herbert Hoover. Norris said of Hoover: 
Using his power of veto, he destroyed the Muscle Shoals billa measure designated to utilize the great government property at Muscle Shoals for the cheapening of fertilizer for American agriculture and utilization of the surplus power for the benefit of people without transmission distance of the development. The power people want no yardstick which would expose their extortionate rates so Hoover killed the bill after it had been passed by both houses of congress.

In 1933 the project for the Muscle Shoals Bill became part of the New Deal's Tennessee Valley Authority (TVA).

Although a nominal Republican (which was essential to his seniority), Norris routinely attacked and voted against the Republican administrations of Warren G. Harding, Calvin Coolidge, and Herbert Hoover. Norris supported Democrats Al Smith and Franklin D. Roosevelt for president in 1928 and 1932, respectively. Republican regulars called him one of the "sons of the wild jackass".

Norris was a staunch "dry", battling against alcohol even when the crusade lost favor during the Great Depression. Prohibition was ended in 1933. He told voters prohibition means "this greatest evil of all mankind is driven from the homes of the American people," even if it means "we are giving up some of our personal rights and personal privileges."

In 1932, along with Fiorello H. La Guardia (R-New York), a Representative from New York City, Norris secured passage of the Norris–La Guardia Act. It prohibited the practice of employers' requiring prospective employees to commit to not joining a labor union as a condition of employment (the so-called yellow-dog contract) and greatly limited the use of court injunctions against strikes.

Norris opposed anti-lynching legislation, claiming it was unconstitutional and would lead to another civil war. He voted in 1935 along primarily with Democrats to adjourn the United States Senate as the chamber was deadlocked over the Costigan-Wagner Act; the anti-lynching bill was ultimately defeated. In spite of his opposition towards anti-lynching bills, Norris led efforts to outlaw poll taxes.

New Dealer

A staunch supporter of President Roosevelt's New Deal programs, Norris sponsored the Tennessee Valley Authority Act of 1933. In appreciation, the Norris Dam  and Norris, Tennessee, a new planned city, were named after him. Norris was also the prime Senate supporter of the Rural Electrification Act, which brought electrical service to underserved and unserved rural areas across the United States. Given Norris's belief in "public power", no privately owned electric utilities have operated in Nebraska since the late 1940s.

Norris believed in the wisdom of the common people and in the progress of civilization. "To get good government and to retain it, it is necessary that a liberty-loving, educated, intelligent people should be ever watchful, to carefully guard and protect their rights and liberties," Norris said in a 1934 speech, "The Model Legislature". The people were capable of being the government, he said, affirming his populist/progressive credentials. To alert the people, he called for transparency in government. "Publicity," he proclaimed, "is the greatest cure for evils which may exist in government".

In 1936 Norris left the Republican Party, as the Democratic majority had reduced his seniority power. The Democrats offered him chairmanships. That year he was re-elected to the Senate as an Independent with some Democratic Party support. Norris won with 43.8% of the vote against Republican former congressman Robert G. Simmons (who came in second) and Democratic former congressman Terry Carpenter (who came in a distant third).

Norris opposed Roosevelt's Judiciary Reorganization Bill of 1937 to pack the Supreme Court, and railed against corrupt patronage. In late 1937, when Norris saw the famous photograph "Bloody Saturday" (showing a burned Chinese baby crying in a bombed-out train station after the Japanese invasion), he shifted his stance on isolationism and non-interventionism. Siding against Japanese violence in China and Korea, he called the Japanese "disgraceful, ignoble, barbarous, and cruel, even beyond the power of language to describe".

Unable to secure Democratic support in the state in 1942, Norris was defeated by Republican Kenneth S. Wherry. He departed from office saying, "I have done my best to repudiate wrong and evil in government affairs."

Legacy and memorials

Norris is one of eight senators profiled in John F. Kennedy's Profiles in Courage, included for opposing Speaker Cannon's autocratic power in the House, for speaking out against arming U.S. merchant ships during the United States' neutral period in World War I, and for supporting the presidential campaign of Democrat Al Smith.

The principal north–south street through downtown McCook, Nebraska, is named George Norris Avenue. Norris's house in McCook is listed in the National Register of Historic Places, and is operated as a museum by the Nebraska State Historical Society.

In February 1984, the west legislative chamber of the Nebraska State Capitol, home of the legislature since 1937, was named in Norris's honor.

George W. Norris Middle School in Omaha, Nebraska; the George W. Norris K–12 school system near Firth, Nebraska; and George W. Norris Elementary School in Millard Public Schools, memorialize the late Senator. When several public power districts in southeastern Nebraska merged into one in 1941, the new utility was named the Norris Public Power District in Senator Norris's honor.

On 11 July 1961, a .04 stamp was issued in his honour. It depicts, in shades of green, a TVA dam in the upper left, with his portrait in later life, to the right. "Gentle knight of progressive ideals" a quote on his character from FDR, is inscribed at the bottom left, while George W. Norris  appears below his portrait.

See also
 List of United States senators who switched parties

Notes and references

Bibliography

 Fellman, David. "The Liberalism of Senator Norris", American Political Science Review (1946) 40:27–41 in JSTOR
 Lowitt, Richard
 George W. Norris: The Making of a Progressive, 1861–1912 (1963)
 George W. Norris; The Persistence of a Progressive, 1913–1933 (1971)
 George W. Norris: The Triumph of a Progressive, 1933–1944 (1978)
 "George W Norris: A Reflective View", Nebraska History 70 (1989): 297–302. 
 Norris, George W. Fighting Liberal: The Autobiography of George W. Norris (1945; reprinted 1972)
 Zucker, Norman L. George W. Norris: Gentle Knight of American Democracy (1966) online

External links

 
 
 Encyclopedia of Baldwin Wallace History: George Norris

 
 

1861 births
1944 deaths
Independent United States senators
Nebraska lawyers
Nebraska state court judges
Valparaiso University School of Law alumni
Baldwin Wallace University alumni
People from McCook, Nebraska
People from Sandusky County, Ohio
Republican Party United States senators from Nebraska
Nebraska Independents
Republican Party members of the United States House of Representatives from Nebraska
American anti–World War I activists
Activists from Ohio
Activists from Nebraska
Left-wing populism in the United States
Progressivism in the United States
Non-interventionism